Each year, American newspaper USA Today awards outstanding high school American football players with a place on its All-USA High School Football Team. The newspaper names athletes that its sports journalists believe to be the best football players from high schools around the United States. The newspaper has named a team every year since 1982.

In addition, two members of the team are named the USA Today High School Offensive Player and Defensive Player of the Year. The newspaper also selects a USA Today High School Football Coach of the Year.

Teams
Note: Bold denotes Offensive and Defensive Players of the Year, respectively, and ‡ denotes high school juniors

1982–1989

1990–1999

2000–2009

2010 team
See footnotes

Coach of the Year: Lance Pogue (South Panola High School, Batesville, Mississippi)
Super 25's Top Team: South Panola High School, Batesville, Mississippi
Final Super 25 Team Rankings
Regional Rankings (top 10 in each region: East, South, Midwest, West)
Note: Bold denotes Offensive and Defensive Players of the Year, respectively, and ‡ denotes high school juniors

First Team Offense

First Team Defense

Second Team Offense

Second Team Defense

2011 team
See footnotes

Coach of the Year: Bob Beatty (Trinity High School, Louisville, Kentucky)
Super 25's Top Team: Don Bosco Preparatory High School, Ramsey, New Jersey
Note: Bold denotes Offensive and Defensive Players of the Year, respectively, and ‡ denotes high school juniors

First Team Offense

First Team Defense

Second Team Offense

Second Team Defense

2012 team
See footnotes

Coach of the Year: J. T. Curtis (John Curtis Christian High School, River Ridge, Louisiana)
Super 25's Top Team: John Curtis Christian High School, River Ridge, Louisiana
Note: Bold denotes Offensive and Defensive Players of the Year, respectively, and ‡ and ‡‡ denotes high school juniors and sophomores, respectively

First Team Offense

First Team Defense

Second Team Offense

Second Team Defense

2013 team
See footnotes

Coach of the Year: Al Fracassa (Brother Rice High School, Bloomfield Hills, Michigan)
Super 25's Top Team: Booker T. Washington High School, Miami, Florida
Note: Bold denotes Offensive and Defensive Players of the Year, respectively, and ‡ denotes high school juniors

First Team Offense

First Team Defense

Second Team Offense

Second Team Defense

2014 team
See footnotes

Coach of the Year: Tony Sanchez (Bishop Gorman High School, Las Vegas, Nevada)
Super 25's Top Team: Bishop Gorman High School, Las Vegas, Nevada
Note: Bold denotes Offensive and Defensive Players of the Year, respectively, and ‡ denotes high school juniors

First Team Offense

First Team Defense

Second Team Offense

Second Team Defense

2015 team
See footnotes

Coach of the Year: Matt Logan (Centennial High School, Corona, California)
Super 25's Top Team: Bishop Gorman High School, Las Vegas, Nevada
Note: Bold denotes Offensive and Defensive Players of the Year, respectively, and ‡ denotes high school juniors

First Team Offense

First Team Defense

Second Team Offense

Second Team Defense

2016 team
See footnotes

Coach of the Year: Kevin Kelley (Pulaski Academy, Little Rock, Arkansas)
Note: Bold denotes Offensive and Defensive Players of the Year, respectively, and ‡ denotes high school juniors

First Team Offense

First Team Defense

Second Team Offense

Second Team Defense

2017 team
See footnotes

Coach of the Year: Bruce Rollinson (Mater Dei High School, Santa Ana, California)
Note: Bold denotes Offensive and Defensive Players of the Year, respectively, and ‡ denotes high school juniors

First Team Offense

First Team Defense

Second Team Offense

Second Team Defense

2018 team
See footnotes

Coach of the Year: Randy Trivers (Gonzaga College High School, Washington, D.C.)
Note: Bold denotes Offensive and Defensive Players of the Year, respectively, and ‡ denotes high school juniors

First Team Offense

First Team Defense

Second Team Offense

Second Team Defense

2019 team
See footnotes

Coach of the Year: Reginald Samples (Duncanville High School, Duncanville, Texas)
Note: Bold denotes Offensive and Defensive Players of the Year, respectively, and ‡ denotes high school juniors

First Team Offense

First Team Defense

Second Team Offense

Second Team Defense

Accumulated stats
Most selections by school

Most selections by state

See also
USA Today All-USA high school baseball team
USA Today All-USA high school basketball team
Gatorade high school football Player of the Year
USA Today/National Prep Poll High School Football National Championship
Big 33 Football Classic
National High School Hall of Fame

References

High school football trophies and awards in the United States
Awards established in 1982
USA Today
Awards by newspapers
1982 establishments in the United States